Il Regno (Italian: the Kingdom) is a Catholic magazine published by the Northern Italian Province of Dehonian Fathers in Bologna, Italy. The magazine has been in circulation since 1956.

History and profile
Il Regno was launched in 1956 by the Northern Italian Province of Dehonian Fathers. The magazine is based in Bologna. From 1964 the magazine has published a supplement which covered the Pontifical documents. It has a left-wing political stance and opposed the ban on contraceptives in 1966.

Il Regno was published on a bimonthly basis until 2015 when it folded. Later the magazine was restarted.

References

External links
 

1956 establishments in Italy
Bi-monthly magazines published in Italy
Catholic magazines published in Italy
Italian-language magazines
Magazines established in 1956
Mass media in Bologna